Godfrey Arnold Pell (born 11 March 1928) is a former English cricketer.  Pell was a right-handed batsman who bowled leg break googly.  He was born at Sunderland, County Durham, and was educated at King Edward's School, Birmingham.

Pell made a single first-class appearance for Warwickshire against Scotland at Edgbaston in 1947.  Scotland made 158 in their first-innings, with Pell taking the wickets of Robert Hodge and Robert McLaren with figures of 2/22 from 6 overs.  In response Warwickshire made 210 all out, with Pell being dismissed for 8 runs by William Nichol.  Scotland made just 112 in their second-innings, with Pell taking the wickets of David Merson and George Youngson to finish with figures of 2/9 from 6.2 overs.  Warwickshire's target to win the match was 61, which Warwickshire made with 6 wickets down, with Pell ending the innings unbeaten on 16.  This was his only major appearance for Warwickshire.

References

External links
Godfrey Pell at ESPNcricinfo
Godfrey Pell at CricketArchive

1928 births
Living people
Cricketers from Sunderland
People educated at King Edward's School, Birmingham
English cricketers
Warwickshire cricketers